Dennis Bruce Hankins (born 1959) is an American diplomat who served as United States Ambassador to Mali between 2019 and 2022.

Consular career
Hankins joined the Foreign Service in 1984. His first overseas postings were as vice-consul in Recife, Brazil and then in the U.S. Embassy in Thailand. In 1989, Hankins was posted to Sudan and then in 1992, given the job of consul in Haiti.

Four years later, Hankins was again posted to Africa to become the political and economic counselor in the Kinshasa embassy in the Democratic Republic of the Congo, working there during the First Congo War and, for a lesser time, the Second Congo War. He moved to be the political and economic counselor in Lisbon, Portugal in 1999, spending just two years in the job before returning to Africa to be the deputy chief of mission in Maputo, Mozambique.

In 2004, Hankins was appointed consul general in Riyadh, Saudi Arabia but was recalled to Washington to become the deputy director of the Office of Peacekeeping in the Bureau of International Organizations. He returned to Africa in 2007 to be deputy chief of mission in Nouakchott, Mauritania and, in 2010, returned to Khartoum, Sudan as the deputy chief of mission.

In 2012, Hankins was given the post of consul general in Sao Paulo, Brazil, staying in the post until his nomination as United States Ambassador to Guinea by President Obama on the 8 July 2015. He was confirmed by the Senate on 22 October the same year.

On 13 August 2018, President Trump announced his intention to nominate Hankins to be the U.S. Ambassador to Mali. The nomination was tendered to the Senate on the August 16, 2018 and he was confirmed on January 2, 2019. He presented his credentials to President Ibrahim Boubacar Keïta on March 15, 2019.

Personal life
Hankins has a wife, Mira, and a son, Danu, who works for the U.S. Navy. He speaks French and Portuguese.

References

|-

1959 births
Living people
Georgetown University alumni
United States Foreign Service personnel
National War College alumni
Ambassadors of the United States to Guinea
Ambassadors of the United States to Mali
21st-century American diplomats